Amédée Rolland (22 January 1914 – 9 June 2000) was a French racing cyclist. He rode in the 1948 Tour de France.

References

External links
 

1914 births
2000 deaths
French male cyclists
Cyclists from Nice